Stephan James (born 23 June 1993) is a Guyanese athlete in the 400m sprint.

In 2014 he received a two-year scholarship to the ASA College in Brooklyn, New York.

Personal bests

Outdoor
200 m: 20.94 s (wind: +0.5 m/s) –  Mesa, Arizona, 17 May 2014
400 m: 46.15 s –  Mesa, Arizona, 17 May 2014

Achievements

References

External links

1993 births
Living people
Sportspeople from Georgetown, Guyana
Guyanese male sprinters
Athletes (track and field) at the 2014 Commonwealth Games
Commonwealth Games competitors for Guyana
Competitors at the 2014 Central American and Caribbean Games